Calolydella lathami is a species of bristle fly in the family Tachinidae.

Distribution
Canada, United States.

References

Exoristinae
Insects described in 1925
Taxa named by Charles Howard Curran
Diptera of North America